Elphinstone High School was a school established in 1822 in Bombay, India in honour of Mountstuart Elphinstone, Governor of Bombay (1819–1827). In 1834 the Elphinstone Institute was founded, which started the Elphinstone College. The English medium school in Bombay was renamed as the Elphinstone High School. 

Dr Babasaheb Ambedkar was admitted in Elphinstone High School in 1904. He completed his matriculation in 1907. He was the first untouchable in India to achieve the matriculation feat.

References
Greater Bombay District Gazetteer 1986, British Period
Greater Bombay District Gazetteer 1986, Public Life
Education in India in the 19th Century

High schools and secondary schools in Mumbai